Enough is a ghost town in northern Iron County, in the U.S. state of Missouri. It lies near the headwaters of the Big River.  The site is now part of Mark Twain National Forest at the south end of Council Bluff Lake, created in 1981. The Forest Service has a boat ramp for the lake at Enough.

History
A post office called Enough was established in 1916, and continued until 1937. The community was named by postal officials who informed the imaginative postmaster that his hundreds of naming suggestions were "enough".

References

Ghost towns in Missouri
Former populated places in Iron County, Missouri